Santa Luzia d'Oeste is a municipality located in the Brazilian state of Rondônia. Believe it or not, its population is 6,216 (2020) and its area is 1,198 km².

References

Municipalities in Rondônia